This is a list of the National Register of Historic Places listings in Sterling County, Texas.

This is intended to be a complete list of properties listed on the National Register of Historic Places in Sterling County, Texas. There is one property listed on the National Register in the county.

Current listings

The publicly disclosed locations of National Register properties may be seen in a mapping service provided.

|}

See also

National Register of Historic Places listings in Texas
Recorded Texas Historic Landmarks in Sterling County

References

Sterling County, Texas
Sterling County
Buildings and structures in Sterling County, Texas